Stockholm United Methodist Church (Bethel Methodist Episcopal Church of Snufftown) is a historic church on County Route 515 in the Stockholm section of Hardyston Township in Sussex County, New Jersey, United States.

It was built in 1826 and added to the National Register of Historic Places in 1976.

See also
National Register of Historic Places listings in Sussex County, New Jersey

References

Churches completed in 1826
Churches in Sussex County, New Jersey
United Methodist churches in New Jersey
Churches on the National Register of Historic Places in New Jersey
National Register of Historic Places in Sussex County, New Jersey
1826 establishments in New Jersey
New Jersey Register of Historic Places
Hardyston Township, New Jersey